Dr. Charles E. Brimm Medical Arts High School (Brimm Medical Arts) is a four-year magnet public high school with a "break the mold" vision focused directly on medicine, dentistry, nursing, allied health professions and other ancillary health care areas. This school serves students in ninth through twelfth grades from Camden in Camden County, New Jersey, United States, as part of the Camden City Public Schools. The school opened in 1994 with a freshman class of 60 students.

As of the 2021–22 school year, the school had an enrollment of 205 students and 25.5 classroom teachers (on an FTE basis), for a student–teacher ratio of 8.0:1. There were 129 students (62.9% of enrollment) eligible for free lunch and none eligible for reduced-cost lunch.

History
The school opened on the campus of Our Lady of Lourdes Medical Center in September 1994 as Medical Arts High School, with an initial class of 60 students.

With the opening in September 1996 of a standalone school building constructed at a cost of $3.1 million (equivalent to $ in ) and designed to accommodate an enrollment of 300 students, the school became known as Dr. Charles E. Brimm Medical Arts High School.

The school had been accredited by the Middle States Association of Colleges and Schools Commissions on Elementary and Secondary Schools until 2013, when the school's accreditation status was removed.

Awards, recognition and rankings
The school was the 243rd-ranked public high school in New Jersey out of 339 schools statewide in New Jersey Monthly magazine's September 2014 cover story on the state's "Top Public High Schools", using a new ranking methodology. The school had been ranked 208th in the state of 328 schools in 2012, after being ranked 157th out of 322 schools listed in 2010. The magazine ranked the school 71st in 2008 out of 316 schools. The school was ranked 105th in the magazine's September 2006 issue, which included 316 schools across the state.

Athletics
Brimm does not offer its own athletic programs. Students who would like to participate in athletics may play for the teams of Camden High School and Woodrow Wilson High School.

Administration
The school's principal is Corinne J. Macrina.

Notable alumni
 Sean Chandler (born 1996), American football safety for the New York Giants of the NFL.

References

External links 
Brimm Medical Arts High School
Camden City Public Schools

School Data for the Camden City Public Schools, National Center for Education Statistics

1994 establishments in New Jersey
Educational institutions established in 1994
High schools in Camden, New Jersey
Magnet schools in New Jersey
Public high schools in Camden County, New Jersey